Las Navas del Marqués is a municipality located in the province of Ávila, Castile and León, Spain. It is 82 km to the northwest of Madrid.  There are some different options to travel there from Madrid or Avila: you can go by car or by train. Although the train station is roughly 2 km away from the town, there are many buses that you can take every time you arrive here by train. There are trains every day connecting Las Navas to Madrid or Las Navas to Ávila.
According to the 2007 census (INE), the municipality has a population of 5,098 inhabitants.
According to statistics from 1 January 2016, Las Navas del Marqués had a population of 5,272 inhabitants.
In summer, the population is five times bigger because the municipality receives many people from Madrid who spend their summer here because it is less hot than in the city.

Geography 
Las Navas del Marqués is located in the center of the Iberian peninsula, between the Gredos and Guadarrama mountains. It is located at 1300 meters above sea level. It has a mountain-mediterranean climate, with very cold winters and mild or warm summers.

Flora 
Las Navas del Marqués is surrounded by huge pine forests. Many people come from Madrid every weekend to enjoy walking through them and to benefit from the fresh air. The municipality has a fresh oak grove around called "La Fuente del Sauco" and in the summer people go there to have lunch and dinner.

Fauna 
The surroundings of Las Navas del Marqués  is home to many different species of wildlife, the most important one being the black stork.

Monuments 
Some important monuments that are interesting to visit are the palace-castle of Magalia which was built in the 16th century and holds important events every year; San Juan Bautista Church,  and San Pablo Convent which was left until 2007, now it shows temporal art exhibitions. Also located is the Eiffel lookout, attributed to the artist Gustave Eiffel.

Festivals 
The most important events in Las Navas  are their summer festivals. They start on the second Sunday of July and they are celebrated in honor of the Cristo de Gracia. The festival week is opened with a firework display and during the week there are races, as well as sports and food competitions, bullfights and open-air dancing.
It is worth noting the Valladal Pilgrimage on 15 August, in which people wear costumes and go to the countryside in floats and horses. There they have lunch and play games together (like greasy pole and sack races) and then they decide which is the best float and the best horse.

References

Municipalities in the Province of Ávila